Brigadier John Amadu Bangura, CBE (8 March 1930 – 29 March 1970) was a Sierra Leonean who served as Chief of the Defence Staff of the Sierra Leone Armed Forces from 1968 to 1970. Prior to this in 1967, he served as the Sierra Leonean Ambassador of to the United States. He was the acting Governor-General of Sierra Leone from 18 April 1968 until 22 April 1968. He led the Sergeants' Coup in 1968 that successfully re-instated civilian rule in Sierra Leone.

Early life 

Bangura was born on 8 March 1930 at Kalangba, Karene Chiefdom, Bombali District, British Sierra Leone. He was educated at Binkolo and Rogbaneh American Wesleyan Mission Schools, and Koyeima and Bo Government Secondary Schools.

He left school in 1949 and joined the army in 1950. While in the other ranks he served and attended courses in both Ghana and Nigeria. In one such course, the Platoon Commanders' course in Burma Camp, Teshie, Ghana, he graduated first in a group of sixteen warrant officers and senior non-commissioned officers.

The impressive qualities of leadership manifested in his keen sense of duty, intelligence, and fitness allowed him to face the Special Selection Board at which the late General Sir Lashmer Whistler, C.M.G., D.S.O., O.B.E., M.C., then colonel-in-chief of the Royal West African Frontier Force, was chairman.

His performance at Teshie Camp necessitated his transfer to Eaton Hall, Mons Officer Cadet School, Aldershot, in 1952. At Mons, he was recommended by the British Army for more rigorous training at the Royal Military Academy Sandhurst. On graduation from Sandhurst in August 1954, he was commissioned as a second lieutenant.

After a successful Young Officers' Course at Hythe and Warminster, Bangura was posted on secondment to the British Army on the Rhine in West Germany. While on secondment, he was promoted to the rank of lieutenant.

Bangura returned to Sierra Leone in 1955 and was appointed commander of a Rifle Company's Platoon in the First Battalion, the Royal Sierra Leone Regiment. In 1958 he was promoted to the rank of captain. In 1962 he served with the First Sierra Leone Contingent on the Congo Operations of the United Nations Organization. On his return home that year he was promoted to the rank of major.

In 1964, Bangura became commanding officer of the First Battalion the Royal Sierra Leone Regiment, attaining the rank of lieutenant-colonel. These promotions were preceded or followed by several successful courses in various military training centers in the United Kingdom. One such course was the All Arms Division Course for substantive Majors in the British Army.

In 1966 Bangura was posted to attend the Joint Services Staff College (UK) (J.S.S.C.) in Latimer, Buckinghamshire, and became a fellow of the college. In the same year, he was promoted to the rank of full colonel.

After a period of successful military career, he was arrested and detained at Pademba Road Prisons prior to the March 1967 general elections by David Lansana under orders from Albert Margai. He was, however, released in March that year by Brigadier Andrew Juxon-Smith and appointed counsellor and head of the chancery at the Sierra Leone Embassy in Washington D.C.
While in the US, he was given orders by John Karefa-Smart to go to Guinea with Siaka Steven to train in guerrilla techniques. He mysteriously disappeared from his post to become chairman of the National Interim Council (NIC) which brought back civilian rule after a successful takeover of power from the military junta, the National Reformation Council (NRC) in 1968. He became commander of the First Battalion of the Royal Sierra Leone Regiment, and of the Royal Sierra Leone Military Forces after this operation. On 1 May 1969, he was promoted to the rank of brigadier and honored in the 1970 New Year Honours with the C.B.E. (Commander of the Order of the British Empire) (Military Division). Brigadier John Amadu Bangura's thorough military training and great experience made him what he was a rare soldier.

He was married and had eight children.

Sergeants' Coup 

Bangura played a pivotal role in the history of post-colonial Sierra Leone. A staunch supporter of democratic principles, he took issue when the government began to collapse after a series of coups that followed the hotly contested elections of March 1967.

Bangura formed the Anti-Corruption Revolutionary Movement (ACRM) with a group of non-commissioned officers. In April 1968, he led the Sergeants' Coup and overthrew Brigadier Andrew Juxon-Smith and his National Reformation Council (NRC). Bangura arrested every high-ranking officer in the army and police so that he could restore the constitution and democracy to Sierra Leone.

There was another side to Bangura. Some accused him of being a bully, a tribalist, with no regard for authority in the military, as violent and having no principles. Being an army personnel, he betrayed his profession not once but twice. Firstly, by joining Stevens and other APC cohorts to plan an invasion of Sierra Leone, the very country he was employed and nurtured to protect and defend. The army was unhappy about this but the worst was to come when Bangura connived with some NCOs to overthrow the NRC government and impose Stevens on the people. Some argued that Stevens knew his violent potential and his position in the heart and mind of the army. Some of Bangura's associates were in the pay pocket of Stevens, hence they were spies. Bangura did plan a coup and Stevens knew every stage of the process that he let it go on to have grounds to liquidate Bangura. The army was happy to see the end of Bangura and when the hour came, they looked the other way while Bangura and his political friend slugged it out.

Bangura was political army personnel, while Sir Albert, as a lawyer was a constitutionalist and resorted to due process. Stevens was a thug (rally man) and street graduate and enjoyed sending closed associates to the gallows and displayed their bodies in public as a trophy of political prowess. Stevens was quoted as saying that he was no Sir Albert who was afraid of Bangura thus sending him abroad as a diplomat that he (Stevens) would teach Bangura a lesson in politics by sending him down the gallows. When this hour came, Bangura had no ally and he was left in the hands of his former friend turned enemy.

Bangura was appointed acting Governor-General of Sierra Leone by the ACRM. Bangura, who was not politically ambitious, served briefly from 18 April 1968 to 22 April 1968. He gave the post of Prime Minister to Siaka Stevens, leader of the All People's Congress, the post of Prime Minister. Bangura did not do this for any personal reasons but because his predecessor Governor General Sir Henry Lightfoot Boston had declared the APC the winners of the election.

Political prisoner 

Bangura was a magnetic and popular figure. The army was devoted to him and this made him potentially dangerous to Stevens' new agenda in the shifting political climate of Sierra Leone. Bangura was widely considered the only person who could put the brakes on Stevens.

Stevens had campaigned on a platform of socialist principles. However, when he became Prime Minister he abandoned his pre-election promises and employed an authoritarian model of governance. Bangura, an ardent Democrat, was greatly disappointed and he criticised Stevens' policies.

Stevens began to cut funds for the army which he saw as a threat to him attaining absolute power. Bangura spoke out against the Stevens regime and was promptly arrested in 1970. He was charged with conspiracy and plotting to commit a coup d'état against the Stevens government.

Execution 
In 1970, Prime Minister Stevens had Bangura arrested and charged with conspiracy. Bangura was sentenced to death by execution for treason against the state.

In spite of the fact that Bangura had put Stevens in power after The 1968 Sergeants' Coup, his requests for clemency were denied.

On 29 March 1970, the day of his execution, Bangura wept in disbelief and refused to be led to the gallows. He was beaten to death and concentrated acid was poured on his remains.

To prevent people from making a martyr of Bangura, Stevens ordered his body to be buried at an undisclosed location which he had paved over with the Kissy Road.

After Stevens retired from office he told a reporter that he regretted having Bangura killed, stating "I should not have allowed those executions."

Siaka Stevens wrote in his book,"I am fully aware that many people were shocked when these sentences were carried out and that even today, much speculation goes on as to what prompted me to allow the law to take its course. There is even a fantastic rumour circulating that I had actually decided to commute the sentences to terms of imprisonment but that certain strong party members had forced me to change my mind. Let me put the record straight here and now. No single person, nor even the demonstrations in favour of the death sentence that filed through the city, had any influence whatsoever on the action I was obliged to take. For me it was a dreadful act. I had to wrench myself out of my own character."

References

Sierra Leonean politicians
Sierra Leonean Christians
Leaders who took power by coup
Governors-General of Sierra Leone
Sierra Leonean military personnel
1970 deaths
1930 births
Commanders of the Order of the British Empire
Graduates of the Mons Officer Cadet School
Graduates of the Royal Military Academy Sandhurst
Executed Sierra Leonean people
People executed by Sierra Leone by hanging
20th-century executions by Sierra Leone
20th-century Sierra Leonean politicians
People from Bombali District